The 2016–17 Maltese Premier League was the 102nd season of the Maltese Premier League. The season began on 19 August 2016 and concluded on 6 May 2017; the relegation play-off took place on 12 May 2017. Valletta were the defending champions, having won their 23rd title the previous season.

On 30 April 2017, Hibernians defeated St. Andrews 3–1 to clinch their 12th Maltese league title.

Format
For this season, in a change from recent previous seasons, points earned in the first 22 matches were no longer halved. Each team therefore played 33 matches, home-and-away against each other team (22 matches), and then one more match (either home or away) against each other team.

Venues

Teams and stadiums

Naxxar Lions and Qormi were relegated to the 2016–17 Maltese First Division after they finished eleventh and twelfth, respectively, the previous season. They were replaced by Gżira United and Ħamrun Spartans, champions and runners-up respectively of the 2015–16 Maltese First Division.

Source: Scoresway

League table

Results

Matches 1–22

Matches 23–33

Relegation play-offs

A play-off match took place between the eleventh-placed team from the Premier League, Mosta, and the fourth-placed team from the First Division, Qormi, for a place in the 2017–18 Maltese Premier League. Mosta retained their spot in the Maltese Premier League, while Qormi remained in the Maltese First Division.

Top scorers

References

External links
 
 Premier League at UEFA.com

Maltese Premier League seasons
Malta
1